General elections were held in the British Virgin Islands on 11 October 1960 for seats on the Legislative Council of the British Virgin Islands.

For the general election the Territory was divided into five districts, the largest of which (the 2nd District - Road Town) would have two members.  All seats were contested.

The Supervisor of Elections was Norwell Elton Allenby Harrigan.

Candidates
At the time candidates were not affiliated with political parties. The following candidates stood:

Results

References

Elections in the British Virgin Islands
British Virgin
General election
October 1960 events in North America
British Virgin
Election and referendum articles with incomplete results